Jon Gordon (born 1966 in New York City) is an American jazz saxophonist who leads the Jon Gordon Quartet. In 1996, he won first prize in the Thelonious Monk International Jazz Saxophone Competition.

He is currently a professor in the jazz program at the University of Manitoba in Winnipeg, Manitoba, Canada. He received a Juno Award nomination for Jazz Album of the Year (Solo) at the Juno Awards of 2022 for his album Stranger Than Fiction. He and faculty colleague Will Bonness, who won the award, both played on each other's albums.

Discography

As leader 
 1988: Beginnings and Endings (Taurus, 1989)
 1992: The Jon Gordon Quartet (Chiaroscuro, 1992)
 1994: Ask Me Now (Criss Cross, 1995)
 1994: Spark (Chiaroscuro, 1995)
 1995: Witness (Criss Cross, 1996)
 1997: Along the Way (Criss Cross, 1997)
 1998: Currents (Double-Time, 1998)
 1999?: The Things We Need (Double-Time, 1999)
 2000?: Possibilities (Double-Time, 2000)
 2001?: Contrasts with Bill Charlap (Double-Time, 2001)
 2007?: The Things You Are (ArtistShare, 2007)
 2009?: Evolution (ArtistShare, 2009)
 2018: Answer (ArtistShare, 2019)
 2021?: Stranger Than Fiction (ArtistShare, 2021)

References

External links
Jon Gordon website

Living people
1966 births
American jazz alto saxophonists
American male saxophonists
American expatriate musicians in Canada
Taurus Records artists
21st-century American saxophonists
21st-century American male musicians
American male jazz musicians
Double-Time Records artists
Criss Cross Jazz artists
Chiaroscuro Records artists
ArtistShare artists
Academic staff of the University of Manitoba